The rivière du Grand Portage Sud-Est (English: Grand Portage South-East River) is a tributary of rivière du Grand Portage, flowing into the unorganized territory of Lac-Ashuapmushuan in the Le Domaine-du-Roy Regional County Municipality, in the administrative region of Saguenay–Lac-Saint-Jean, in the province of Quebec, in Canada.

The upper part of the valley of the Grand Portage Sud-Est river is mainly served by the forest road R0211 which goes up the valley of the rivière du Pilet. The lower part is served indirectly by forest road R0204 which connects north to route 167.

Forestry (mainly forestry) is the main economic activity in this valley; secondly, recreational tourism activities, mainly because of the Ashuapmushuan Wildlife Reserve.

Geography 
The Grand Portage Sud-Est river draws its source from Lac Demers.

This spring is located in a mountainous area in the unorganized territory of Lac-Ashuapmushuan, at:
  east of the mouth of the Grand Portage Sud-Est river;
  south-east of the mouth of the rivière du Grand Portage;
  south of the old Frigon station of the Canadian National railway;
  southwest of the course of the Ashuapmushuan River.

  towards the west, forming coils and a loop towards the north, to a stream (coming from the south);
  first to the northwest, then to the west down the mountain, to the Lavin stream (coming from the south);
  north, up to its mouth.

The Rivière du Grand Porcharge Sud-Est flows onto the south bank of the Rivière du Grand Portage. This confluence is located at:
  south-east of the mouth of the Grand Portage river;
  south-west of the mouth of the Chigoubiche river;
  west of downtown Saint-Félicien.

Toponymy 
The toponym "rivière du Grand Portage Sud-Est" was made official on December 5, 1968, at the Place Names Bank of the Commission de toponymie du Québec.

See also 
 Lac-Ashuapmushuan, an unorganized territory
 Ashuapmushuan Wildlife Reserve
 Chigoubiche River
 Ashuapmushuan River
 Rivière du Grand Portage
 List of rivers of Quebec

References 

Rivers of Saguenay–Lac-Saint-Jean
Le Domaine-du-Roy Regional County Municipality